Zhang Ru is a Chinese basketball player. She is part of the Chinese team in the women's tournament at the 2020 Summer Olympics.

References

1999 births
Living people
Basketball players at the 2020 Summer Olympics
Chinese women's basketball players
Olympic basketball players of China